Pennino may refer to:

 Pennino Brothers Jewelry, costume jewelry produced in New York City, USA, from 1927 to 1961
 Edizione-Pennino, a zinfandel wine produced in Napa Valley by Francis Ford Coppola
 Monte Pennino, an approximately 1,570 m high mountain in the Umbria region of Italy
 Adrian Pennino or Paulie Pennino, fictional characters in the Rocky series of movies
 The Pennines or "Pennino Hills", a low-rising mountain range in northern England and southern Scotland
Anthony Pennino music executive, manager, & songwriter/composer Nephew of Italia Pennino
 Gaetano Enrico Pennino, Italian song composer